Stooge sort is a recursive sorting algorithm.
The running time of the algorithm is thus slower compared to reasonable sorting algorithms, and is slower than bubble sort, a canonical example of a fairly inefficient sort. It is however more efficient than Slowsort. The name comes from The Three Stooges.

The algorithm is defined as follows:
 If the value at the start is larger than the value at the end, swap them.
 If there are 3 or more elements in the list, then:
 Stooge sort the initial 2/3 of the list
 Stooge sort the final 2/3 of the list
 Stooge sort the initial 2/3 of the list again

It is important to get the integer sort size used in the recursive calls by rounding the 2/3 upwards, e.g. rounding 2/3 of 5 should give 4 rather than 3, as otherwise the sort can fail on certain data.

Implementation
 function stoogesort(array L, i = 0, j = length(L)-1){
     if L[i] > L[j] then       // If the leftmost element is larger than the rightmost element
         L[i] ↔ L[j]           // Swap the leftmost element and the rightmost element
     if (j - i + 1) > 2 then       // If there are at least 3 elements in the array
         t = floor((j - i + 1) / 3) // Rounding down
         stoogesort(L, i  , j-t)  // Sort the first 2/3 of the array
         stoogesort(L, i+t, j)    // Sort the last 2/3 of the array
         stoogesort(L, i  , j-t)  // Sort the first 2/3 of the array again
     return L
 }

-- Not the best but equal to above 

stoogesort :: (Ord a) => [a] -> [a]
stoogesort [] = []
stoogesort src = innerStoogesort src 0 ((length src) - 1)

innerStoogesort :: (Ord a) => [a] -> Int -> Int -> [a]
innerStoogesort src i j 
    | (j - i + 1) > 2 = src''''
    | otherwise = src'
    where 
        src'    = swap src i j -- need every call
        t = floor (fromIntegral (j - i + 1) / 3.0)
        src''   = innerStoogesort src'   i      (j - t)
        src'''  = innerStoogesort src'' (i + t)  j
        src'''' = innerStoogesort src''' i      (j - t)

swap :: (Ord a) => [a] -> Int -> Int -> [a]
swap src i j 
    | a > b     =  replaceAt (replaceAt src j a) i b
    | otherwise = src
    where 
        a = src !! i
        b = src !! j

replaceAt :: [a] -> Int -> a -> [a]
replaceAt (x:xs) index value
    | index == 0 = value : xs
    | otherwise  =  x : replaceAt xs (index - 1) value

References

Sources

External links
Sorting Algorithms (including Stooge sort)
Stooge sort – implementation and comparison

Sorting algorithms
Comparison sorts
Articles with example pseudocode